This is a list of historical and modern flags used by the Tamil people.

Modern Tamil flags

Indian Tamil flags

Sri Lankan Tamil flags

Historical Tamil flags

See also

Proposed flag of Tamil Nadu (1970)

References 

 
Tamils
Tamils